Brotula is a genus of cusk-eels. It is the only genus is the subfamily Brotulinae.

Species 
There are currently six recognized species in this genus:
 Brotula barbata (Bloch & J. G. Schneider, 1801) (Bearded brotula)
 Brotula clarkae C. L. Hubbs, 1944 (Pacific bearded brotula)
 Brotula flaviviridis D. W. Greenfield, 2005
 Brotula multibarbata Temminck & Schlegel, 1846 (Goatsbeard brotula)
 Brotula ordwayi Hildebrand & F. O. Barton, 1949 (Ordway's brotula)
 Brotula townsendi Fowler, 1900 (Townsend's cusk eel)

References 

Ophidiidae
Perciformes genera
Taxa named by Georges Cuvier